Eupraxia may refer to:

 Eupraxia (mythology)
 Eupraxis, the art of performing a function correctly
 Eupraxia or Euphrasia of Constantinople
 Eupraxia of Kiev, Holy Roman Empress.
 Eupraxia of Ryazan, ]rincess consort of Ryazan by marriage

See also
 Praxis (disambiguation)
 Dyspraxia